Vendetta: Truth, Lies and The Mafia is a 2021 docuseries starring Silvana Saguto, Pino Maniaci and Mauro Terranova.

Cast 
 Silvana Saguto
 Pino Maniaci
 Mauro Terranova
 Bartolomeo Parrino
 Letizia Maniaci
 Patrizia Marchione
 Lorenzo Caramma
 Antonio Ingroia
 Amelia Luise
 Giovanni Maniaci
 Gioacchino De Luca
 Guy Richardson
 Pietro Cavallotti
 Giuseppe Panettino
 Matteo Renzi
 Vittorio Saguto
 Elias Argentiere
 Vincenzo Cavallotti
 Elias
 Maria Teresa Saguto

Release 
Vendetta: Truth, Lies and The Mafia was released on September 24, 2021, on Netflix.

References

External links 
 
 

Netflix original documentary television series
English-language Netflix original programming